Vänersborgs IF is a Swedish football club located in Vänersborg. The club was founded in 1906. The current men's football team head coach is Andy Kilner.

Background
The club was founded in 1906. In the 1940s, it became the first team from Västergötland which made a national impact in bandy, but has since given up this sport.

Vänersborgs IF currently (2021) plays in Division 1 Södra which is the third tier of Swedish football. They play their home matches at Vänersvallen in Vänersborg; the football ground has a capacity of around 2000 people.

The club is affiliated to Västergötlands Fotbollförbund.

Footnotes

External links
 Vänersborgs IF – Official website

Football clubs in Västra Götaland County
Sport in Vänersborg
1906 establishments in Sweden
Association football clubs established in 1906
Bandy clubs established in 1906
Defunct bandy clubs in Sweden